"The Picture of Dorian Gray" is a television play episode of the BBC One anthology television series Play of the Month It stars Peter Firth, Jeremy Brett, and John Gielgud. A 100-minute adaptation of Oscar Wilde's 1890 novel The Picture of Dorian Gray by John Osborne, it was first broadcast on 19 September 1976.

This production was a critical success at the time of its first screening. In 2009 The Times called it the "most Wildean" adaptation of the novel, boasting "perhaps the best Dorian" and mentioning that John Gielgud "steals the show, having of course been given the most beguiling lines by Wilde".

This version accentuates the gay subtext of Wilde's novel more than other versions; e.g. when Dorian wants Alan's help in the disposal of Basil's body, it is strongly suggested that the two had a sexual relationship in the past and when Dorian's seduction attempt fails, he apparently threatens to expose Alan as a homosexual. In the novel and other adaptations the precise nature of Dorian's hold over Alan is mostly left to the imagination of the reader or viewer, respectively.

Cast
 Peter Firth as Dorian Gray
 Jeremy Brett as Basil Hallward
 John Gielgud as Henry Wotton
 Judi Bowker as Sibyl Vane
 Nicholas Ball as James Vane
 Gillian Raine as Mrs Vane
 Nicholas Clay as Alan Campbell
 Michael Barrington as Mr Erskine
 Mark Dignam as Lord Fermor
 Gwen Ffrangcon-Davies as Lady Agatha

See also
 Adaptations of The Picture of Dorian Gray

References

External links
 
 

1976 British television episodes
1976 television plays
BBC television dramas
Play of the Month